Eynallı (also, Eynally) is a village and municipality in the Agstafa Rayon of Azerbaijan.  It has a population of 2,284.

References 

Populated places in Aghstafa District